was a concubine of Japanese daimyō Oda Nobunaga during the Warring-states period (or Sengoku period) in Japanese history. She was born into the third generation of the prosperous and influential Ikoma clan in about 1538 and her father was known as Iemune.

Before Kitsuno became Oda Nobunaga's concubine, she was first wed to Yaheji Dota who died in the battle of Akechi. After the loss of her husband, Kitsuno returned to her family's home, Ikoma mansion.  It was there that she met Oda Nobunaga.

Concubine of Oda Nobunaga 

It was believed that Oda Nobunaga was charmed by Kitsuno's beauty at first sight, and immediately took her as his concubine. Nobunaga was officially married to Lady Nō, the daughter of Saitō Dōsan, but it was believed that theirs was not a happy marriage, especially since Nōhime could not conceive. It is often thought that Kitsuno was Nobunaga's most beloved concubine and that she probably had a higher position than Nōhime.

In 1557 Kitsuno gave birth to Nobutada and later Nobukatsu and Tokuhime (Lady Toku). In 1564, Kitsuno moved to Kori Castle (in present-day Kōnan, Aichi).  She suffered due to the difficulty of her childbirths, and in 1566 she died at the age of 29.

Even though Nobunaga is often regarded as a callous and bellicose figure , it is said that Nobunaga mourned her throughout the night and had her buried within view of his castle.

Her body was cremated and buried in the cemetery at Kyusho temple (the Ikoma family temple), in Tashiro town. Nobunaga gave his son Nobukatsu the area in which Kyusho temple lies in order to protect it and Kitsuno's tomb, out of respect for his treasured concubine.

References

1528 births
1566 deaths
Japanese concubines
Deaths in childbirth
People of Sengoku-period Japan
Women of medieval Japan
16th-century Japanese women
16th-century Japanese people